Feter may refer to:

Jakub Feter, Polish footballer
Fetr, a village in Iran